Lorsica is a comune (municipality) in the Metropolitan City of Genoa in the Italian region Liguria, located about  east of Genoa.

Lorsica borders the following municipalities: Cicagna, Favale di Malvaro, Mocònesi, Montebruno, Neirone, Orero, Rezzoaglio, Torriglia.

References

Cities and towns in Liguria